Zuckenriet Castle is a castle in the municipality of Niederhelfenschwil of the Canton of St. Gallen in Switzerland.  It is a Swiss heritage site of national significance.

See also
 List of castles in Switzerland

References

Cultural property of national significance in the canton of St. Gallen
Castles in the canton of St. Gallen